Tom McDonald may refer to:

Tom McDonald (winemaker) (1907–1987), New Zealand wine-maker
Tommy McDonald (footballer, born 1895) (1895–1969), Scottish football forward for Newcastle United, also known as Tom
Tom McDonald (soccer) (born 1959), American soccer player
Tom McDonald (diplomat) (born 1953), former U.S. Ambassador to Zimbabwe
Tom McDonald (Australian footballer) (born 1992), Australian rules footballer for Melbourne Football Club
Tom McDonald (politician) (born 1946), member of the Missouri House of Representatives
Tom McDonald (footballer, born 1887) (1887-1947), English footballer for Bury

See also
Tom MacDonald (disambiguation)
Tommy McDonald (disambiguation)
Thomas McDonald (disambiguation)